GamePal is an online platform for players of massively multiplayer online (MMO) games to buy, sell and trade digital assets such as in-game currency, items, accounts, and power leveling services. The site is a neutral marketplace that supports player-to-player as well as direct selling for popular MMOs.

History
GamePal emerged in June 2004 as a multi-feature platform for MMORPG players interested in digital asset trading. The buying and selling of in-game assets such as virtual currency is also a practice known as "real money trading" or RMT.

In June 2005, GamePal launched virtual account rental services for gamers who can now rent a high-level character and play as long as they like, then return the character for a different one or for a character in another game.

GamePal worked closely with companies such as IGE expanding their options to virtual account trading allowing the buying, trading and selling of accounts.

References

Massively multiplayer online role-playing games